John Sherwin Crosby (January 13, 1842 – February 24, 1914) was an American author and lecturer on civics and government.

History
He was born on 13 January 1842 in Freedom, Maine,  to Sherwin Crosby and Nancy Jordan Clifford.

Crosby was a single tax advocate, proponent of the Georgism and land value tax ideas of political economist Henry George and priest/social reformer Edward McGlynn, and active member of the Manhattan Single Tax Club. He wrote The Orthocratic State: The Unchanging Principles of Civics and Government which was published in 1915 by Sturgis & Walton Company.

Personal life
He first married Abby Josephine Gardner (1842–1890). They had two children, John Sherwin Crosby and Louise Leonard Crosby.

Nellie Fassett Crosby
Sometime after Abby's 1890 death, Crosby married Nellie Fassett in New York City. She was the founder and president of the Women's Democratic Club of New York City.  It was the first permanent national political organization exclusively established by and for women.

In 1918 she was named as the representative of New York State on the Woman's Advisory Committee of the Democratic National Committee.

Death
John Sherwin Crosby died on 24 February 1914.

See also
 Georgism — economic philosophy named after Henry George.
  — advocates of Georgism.

References

American political writers
Georgists
1842 births
1914 deaths
Writers from New York City
New York (state) Democrats
Tax reform in the United States
20th-century American non-fiction writers
People from Freedom, Maine